The 1980 East Lothian District Council election for the East Lothian Council took place in May 1980, alongside elections to the councils of Scotland's various other districts.

Ward Results

Labour
 Musselburgh 1
 Musselburgh 2
 Musselburgh 3
 Musselburgh 4
 Tranent 
 Ormiston
 Inveresk
 Prestonpans 
 Preston 
 Gladsmuir

Conservative
 Cockenzie
 Haddington
 Lammermuir
 Direleton
 Dunbar
 East Linton
 North Berwick

References

1980
1980 Scottish local elections